Johannes Huibert Prins (1757–1806), was an 18th-century painter from the Northern Netherlands.

Born in The Hague, Johannes Huibert Prins taught himself to paint. According to Jacob Campo Weyerman, his father wanted him to become a doctor and refused to pay for art lessons, but he ignored him and travelled to Paris anyway, sketching cityscapes along the way and making copies of works he found interesting. He became a board member of the Confrerie Pictura in 1785 and is known for his cityscapes.

He died in 1806, in Utrecht.

References

Johannes Huibert Prins on Artnet

1757 births
1806 deaths
18th-century Dutch painters
18th-century Dutch male artists
Dutch male painters
Artists from The Hague
Painters from The Hague